Philip Edgar Russell (born 9 May 1944) is a former English cricketer  who played first-class cricket for Derbyshire between 1965 and 1985.

Russell was born at Ilkeston, Derbyshire. He began playing in the Derbyshire Second XI in 1964, and made his first-class debut at the end of the 1965 season, in a victory against  Nottinghamshire. Russell played in the first team in the 1966 season but saw less action on the 1967 season when Derbyshire were in sixth place.

Russell played for Derbyshire solidly for another decade, until the 1979 season, though he came out of retirement six years later to play briefly in the 1985 season, as a 41-year-old. He continued playing in the 1986 season in the one-day game for Derbyshire. Less agile, and supplemented by Derbyshire's Danish wonder, Ole Mortensen, Russell brought no shame upon himself in his later years.

Russell was a right-arm medium pace bowler and took 339 first-class wickets at an average of 30.53 and a best performance of 7-46. He was a right-handed batsman, and played 170 first-class matches with an average of 12.31 and a top score of 73. He was an occasional wicket-keeper. 
He went on to have a distinguished career as Head Groundsman at Kingsmead Stadium, Durban, South Africa.

Russell's son, Miles, played cricket for the Derbyshire Second XI in 1991.

References

1944 births
English cricketers
Living people
Derbyshire cricketers
International Cavaliers cricketers